Pandora is an unincorporated community and coal town in Westmoreland County, Pennsylvania, United States. It was also known as Snydertown.

References

Unincorporated communities in Westmoreland County, Pennsylvania
Coal towns in Pennsylvania
Unincorporated communities in Pennsylvania